Thembile Kanono (born 30 June 1980 in Thaba Nchu) is a South African football (soccer) midfielder.

References

External links
Player's profile at absapremiership.co.za

1980 births
Living people
People from Mangaung Metropolitan Municipality
South African soccer players
South African Premier Division players
Association football midfielders
Orlando Pirates F.C. players
Santos F.C. (South Africa) players
Bloemfontein Celtic F.C. players